The ground tyrants (Muscisaxicola) are a genus of passerine birds belonging to the tyrant flycatcher family Tyrannidae. There are about 13 different species. They are ground-dwelling birds which inhabit open country in South America, particularly the Andes and Patagonia. Several southern species are migratory, moving northward for the winter. Ground tyrants feed on insects and other invertebrates, mainly by picking them from the ground.

A flight display is performed during the breeding season. The nest is a cup of twigs or grass which, in most species, is built in a burrow, crevice or under rocks.

Ground tyrants are fairly small (13–20 cm in length) with longish legs, a slender bill and an erect posture. The plumage is dull and mainly grey or brown with paler underparts. The head is variably patterned with several species having rufous patches on the crown or white between the bill and eye. The birds have simple calls and are often silent.

Systematics and taxonomy
A study of mitochondrial DNA by Chesser (2000) has shown that the little ground tyrant (M. fluviatilis) is highly divergent and not closely related to the other ground tyrants. All the remaining species are related and form a monophyletic group, although the spot-billed ground tyrant (M. maculirostris) is somewhat divergent from the others. The little and spot-billed ground tyrants are smaller and browner than the other species and the little ground tyrant also differs in its habitat, occurring near rivers in the Amazon rainforest.

The paramo ground tyrant (M. alpinus) and Taczanowski's ground tyrant (M. griseus) were previously treated as a single species but are genetically divergent with the paramo ground tyrant belonging to a southern Andean and Patagonian clade within the genus and Taczanowski's ground tyrant belonging to a central Andean clade. The name plain-capped ground tyrant is used by some authors to refer to M. griseus with paramo ground tyrant used for M. alpinus.

The genus name Muscisaxicola is masculine, therefore the species names griseus, cinereus, maclovianus, alpinus and capistratus are correct rather than grisea, cinerea, macloviana, alpina and capistrata. The names flavinucha and albilora are invariable.

Species list
The genus contains 12 species:
Spot-billed ground tyrant, Muscisaxicola maculirostris
White-fronted ground tyrant, Muscisaxicola albifrons
Ochre-naped ground tyrant, Muscisaxicola flavinucha
Paramo ground tyrant, Muscisaxicola alpinus
Taczanowski's ground tyrant, Muscisaxicola griseus
Cinereous ground tyrant, Muscisaxicola cinereus
Rufous-naped ground tyrant, Muscisaxicola rufivertex
Dark-faced ground tyrant, Muscisaxicola maclovianus
White-browed ground tyrant, Muscisaxicola albilora
Cinnamon-bellied ground tyrant, Muscisaxicola capistratus
Puna ground tyrant, Muscisaxicola juninensis
Black-fronted ground tyrant, Muscisaxicola frontalis

The little ground tyrant was formerly placed in Muscisaxicola but was moved to the monotypic genus Syrtidicola following the publication of a phylogenetic study in 2020.

References

Further reading

Jaramillo, Alvaro; Burke, Peter & Beadle, David (2003) Field Guide to the Birds of Chile, Christopher Helm, London
Vuilleumier, François (1994) Nesting, behavior, distribution and speciation of Patagonian and Andean ground tyrants (Myiotheretes, Xolmis, Neoxolmis, Agriornis and Muscisaxicola), Ornitologia Neotropical, 5: 1–55

External links
Video, spottings and photos on Birds of the world.

Muscisaxicola albifrons—Videos and Photos
Muscisaxicola albilora—Videos and Photos
Muscisaxicola alpinus—Videos and Photos
Muscisaxicola capistratus—Videos and Photos
Muscisaxicola cinereus—Videos and Photos
Muscisaxicola flavinucha—Videos and Photos
Muscisaxicola frontalis—Videos and Photos
Muscisaxicola griseus—Videos and Photos
Muscisaxicola juninensis—Videos and Photos
Muscisaxicola maclovianus—Videos and Photos
Muscisaxicola maculirostris— Videos and Photos
Muscisaxicola rufivertex—Videos and Photos